Nick Johnston is a Canadian guitarist and songwriter who records as a solo artist. As of 2019, he has released five solo records. His albums have featured the work of notable artists such as Paul Gilbert, Marco Minnemann, Guthrie Govan, and Bryan Beller. He has also played on songs by other artists including Intervals, Scale the Summit, Periphery, Polyphia, David Maxim Micic, and Mike Dawes. He has toured extensively with artists including Plini and David Maxim Micic. In May 2019 he went on a North American tour with Between the Buried and Me and The Contortionist.

Johnston has cited musical influences such as Stevie Ray Vaughan, Eddie Van Halen, Yngwie Malmsteen, and Jeff Beck, saying "I sound nothing like those guys, but I’m massively influenced by them". Another influence was Joe Satriani. "Before listening to Joe, I don't think I understood how important a role the melodies played in building compositions", Nick stated in a Total Guitar interview. "I realised he was the guy who'd really figured it out—the balance of technique, tone, melody, and production. While players were learning blues from Hendrix and Clapton, I was learning them from Satriani".
 
The guitarist released his own signature guitar through Schecter in 2016. Schecter has since released additional variants of his signature guitar, splitting them into the USA Signature Series and Traditional Series, with these being premium and affordable versions respectively. He is also passionate about comics and has hired comics illustrators to create his album art.

Discography
Albums
 Public Display of Infection (2011)
 In a Locked Room on the Moon (2013)
 Atomic Mind (2014)
 Remarkably Human (2016)
 Wide Eyes in the Dark (2019)
 Young Language (2021)

Singles
 "Gemini" (2019)
 "A Cure Promised" (2019)
 "Young Language" (2021)
 "Silver Moon Rising" (2021)

Contributions
 "The Parade of Ashes" Clear (Periphery, 2014)
 "Champagne" Muse (Polyphia, 2014)
 "Disorder" Ego (David Maxim Micic, 2015)
 "Slight of Hand" The Shape of Colour (Intervals, 2015)
 "Goddess Gate" In a World of Fear (Scale the Summit, 2017)
 "Slow Dancing in a Burning Room" Era (Mike Dawes, 2017)
 "This Is Living" (Afterwake, 2017)
 "Sleep Walker" Ontology (Technopath, 2017)
 "Ache" Divulgence (Organized Chaos, 2017)
 "Ghost Town" (Zac Tiessen, 2019)
 "Pythoness" Reading the Bones (Keith Merrow, 2019)
 "Fear and Fate" (Archival, 2021)

References

External links
 

Living people
1987 births
21st-century Canadian guitarists
People from Wellington County, Ontario
Canadian male guitarists
Musicians from Ontario
21st-century Canadian male musicians
Canadian songwriters